Peak 8010 is a summit in the Chugach Mountains of Alaska, United States. The prominence is  ranking it 58th on the list of prominent peaks in the United States. The peak is located in the Wrangell-St. Elias National Park and Preserve.

The peak is believed to have been first climbed in 2007 though other reports put it in 2020.

See also

List of mountain peaks of Alaska
List of the most prominent summits of Alaska

References

Mountains of Alaska
Wrangell–St. Elias National Park and Preserve